Control Room Presents is a series which aired on MyNetworkTV in the United States from October 1, 2007 to March 15, 2008. 

The program aired previously recorded music concerts from various popular artists.

External links

Control Room Presents at The Futon Critic

MyNetworkTV original programming
2000s American music television series
2007 American television series debuts
2008 American television series endings